Scincus albifasciatus is a species of lizard which is found in Senegal, Mauritania, Algeria, and Western Sahara.

References

albifasciatus
Reptiles described in 1890
Taxa named by George Albert Boulenger